Grumo Nevano is a comune (municipality) in the Metropolitan City of Naples in the Campania region of Italy, with 17,939 inhabitants.

Physical geography 
It is made up of the two areas (not frazioni) of Grumo and Nevano, united by urban planning for two centuries and under the administrative one since the 20th century.

History 

Before 1863 Grumo and Nevano were two different farmhouses: Grumo included the southern area of the municipality (up to the Basilica of San Tammaro) whereas Nevano included the northern area. In 1700 maps it appeared as Grumi.

Grumo Nevano, like all the other municipalities in the northern area of Naples, has Oscan origins. Some Samnite graves were casually found within the residential area during the 1960s and 1970s and two Latin inscriptions are evident, probably from Atella.

Twin towns – sister cities
  Żagań, Poland

References

External links
 Official website

Cities and towns in Campania